Byglandsfjord Station was a railway station in the village of Byglandsfjord in Bygland municipality in Agder county, Norway.  It was the terminus station for the old Setesdal Line that traveled up the Setesdal valley from Kristiansand - Grovane - Byglandsfjord until the railway line was closed in 1962.  The station sits on the eastern shore of the river Otra, at the south end of the lake Byglandsfjorden.

Further transport into the Setesdal valley happened by steamboat on the Byglandsfjorden lake. One of the steamers, is preserved and still takes passengers during the summer season.

The station was built in the dragestil style and is now used as a library. It was designed by architect Paul Due and listed for protection in 2002.

The entire station area was protected by law in 2002 by the Norwegian Directorate for Cultural Heritage. The protection covers all the buildings: Station building's exterior and interior, outhouse construction, locomotive shed, cargo expedition, platform and loading ramp, in addition to an area around the station.

References

Bygland
Setesdal
Railway stations in Agder
1895 establishments in Norway
1962 disestablishments in Norway
Railway stations opened in 1895
Railway stations closed in 1962
Disused railway stations in Norway
Protected areas of Norway
Millennium sites